Nathaniel "Nat" Kerr (born 31 October 1987) is an English former professional footballer whose preferred position was at right back. He last played at amateur level in Stockport in 2015.

Career
Kerr started his career at Crewe Alexandra youth academy but was picked up by Rotherham United after being released. He made his debut on 21 April 2007 in the 1–0 defeat at Yeovil Town coming on as a late sub for David Worrell. Rotherham had already been relegated at this point of the season and manager Mark Robins played Kerr in all the remaining games. The following season Kerr didn't play at all for the Millers but was loaned out in November 2007 to Northwich Victoria. RAt the end of the season he was released.

On 13 October 2008, Kerr joined Conference National team Barrow on non contract terms after impressing joint management duo Dave Bayliss and Darren Sheridan playing for the Bluebirds' reserve side. He made his debut on 18 October in the home win over Eastbourne Borough. He did not gain a regular place in the team, however, and was released by the club in May 2009.

Assault conviction
On 30 August 2014, while playing for the Longsight pub team AFC Gold Cup, Kerr was sent off for deliberately stamping on the leg of Stuart Parsons. Kerr's actions resulted in Parsons' ankle requiring a pin and plate due to it being broken in two places. Kerr was found guilty of assault, and received a sentence of one year's imprisonment, as a result of the intentional "long jump" tackle.

References

1987 births
Living people
Footballers from Manchester
English footballers
Association football defenders
Northwich Victoria F.C. players
Rotherham United F.C. players
Barrow A.F.C. players
Droylsden F.C. players
English Football League players
National League (English football) players